The 2016 United States presidential election in Indiana was held on Tuesday, November 8, 2016, as part of the 2016 United States presidential election in which all 50 states plus the District of Columbia participated. Indiana voters chose electors to represent them in the Electoral College via a popular vote, pitting the Republican Party's nominee, businessman Donald Trump, and running mate Indiana Governor Mike Pence against Democratic Party nominee, former Secretary of State Hillary Clinton, and her running mate Virginia Senator Tim Kaine. Indiana has 11 electoral votes in the Electoral College.

Trump won the state with 56.47% of the vote, while Clinton received 37.46%. Indiana is the home state of Pence, which was believed to have provided important assistance to the Trump campaign in what already would have been a Republican-leaning state.

Primary elections

Democratic primary

Two candidates appeared on the Democratic presidential primary ballot:
Hillary Clinton
Bernie Sanders

Republican primary

Twelve candidates appeared on the Republican presidential primary ballot:
Jeb Bush (withdrawn)
Ben Carson (withdrawn)
Chris Christie (withdrawn)
Ted Cruz (campaign suspended after loss in Indiana GOP Primary, a 'winner-take-all' primary)
Carly Fiorina (withdrawn)
Jim Gilmore (withdrawn)
Mike Huckabee (withdrawn)
John Kasich
Rand Paul (withdrawn)
Marco Rubio (withdrawn)
Rick Santorum (withdrawn)
Donald Trump

Polling

Donald Trump won every pre-election poll conducted by at least 5 points, and often by double digits. The average of the last 3 polls showed Trump ahead of Hillary Clinton 49% to 38%. Donald Trump had won almost all the undecided vote, as shown by the results where he won 56% to 37%.

Predictions

Results

By congressional district

Trump won 7 of 9 congressional districts.

By county

Counties that flipped from Democratic to Republican
Delaware (largest city: Muncie)
LaPorte (largest city: Michigan City)
Perry (largest city: Tell City)
Porter (largest city: Portage)
Vigo (largest city: Terre Haute)

Analysis

Of the 2,760,375 votes cast, Donald Trump won 1,557,286 votes, Hillary Clinton won 1,033,126 votes and Gary Johnson won 133,993 votes.

Indiana has historically been the most conservative state in the Rust Belt. It went Democratic for Barack Obama in 2008—the first time it had done so since 1964, and only the fourth time since 1912. However, it has shifted back to being solidly Republican. Republican nominee Donald Trump carried the state by 19 points over Democrat Hillary Clinton, thus gaining all of Indiana's 11 electoral votes.

Donald Trump's victory in the Hoosier State can be attributed to several factors. For one, Donald Trump had selected Indiana governor Mike Pence as his running mate, effectively eliminating any chance that Clinton could repeat Obama's surprise upset win in the state over John McCain eight years prior. Also, the state skews whiter and more Evangelical Protestant than the rest of the Midwest and the Rust Belt overall, which is a better demographic make-up for Republicans; Trump won white born-agains and evangelicals by a margin of 75–22.

Suburban communities in the "doughnut counties" surrounding Indianapolis lean heavily Republican, and bolstered the Trump-Pence ticket in the state. Many of these voters are both fiscally and socially conservative. Another GOP stronghold that benefited Trump was the northeast region around Fort Wayne, which is a mix of suburban, exurban and rural areas, and is home to some of the most socially conservative voters in the nation.

In Southern Indiana along the Ohio River, especially around Evansville in Vanderburgh County, the electorate is dominated by "Butternut Democrats" - socially conservative, working-class white voters who were Democrats for generations but have been trending Republican in reaction to the increased social liberalism of national Democrats. Such voters turned out for Trump in full force, inspired by his economic populism and by Pence's social conservatism.

Trump also won in Vigo County, home to Terre Haute and a noted bellwether; it has voted for the winner of every presidential election all but twice since 1892. Clinton, for her part, performed well in Indianapolis in Marion County and in Gary in Lake County, which has a large African American population and is considered part of the Chicago Metropolitan Area. Clinton won African Americans by a margin of 83–12. She also won St. Joseph and Monroe counties, home to the University of Notre Dame and Indiana University, respectively. Areas where Clinton improved on Obama's performance in 2012 were predominantly located in well-educated suburbs of Indianapolis and areas surrounding large universities, where several socially moderate Republicans chose not to vote for Trump out of discomfort for his controversial views on race and women.

See also
 United States presidential elections in Indiana
 2016 Democratic Party presidential debates and forums
 2016 Democratic Party presidential primaries
 2016 Republican Party presidential debates and forums
 2016 Republican Party presidential primaries

References

External links
 RNC 2016 Republican Nominating Process 
 Green papers for 2016 primaries, caucuses, and conventions

IN
2016
Presidential